"Shock To The System" is a song written by Irish singer-songwriter Gemma Hayes for her fourth studio album Let It Break. It was the first single released from this album in May 2011 in Ireland. The single was released in Internationally as a single on 15 May 2012.

Background

The first single 'Shock To My System' was released in early May 2011 in Ireland. The song was added to radio playlists in Ireland on the week beginning 25 April 2011.Initially, Keep Running(previously titled 'Tokyo') was scheduled to be the first single though this was later released on 26 August 2011.

No music video was made for this single.

Release history

References

Gemma Hayes songs
2011 singles
2011 songs
Songs written by Gemma Hayes